José Ciprián Alfonso Pita (born 28 March 1984) is a Cuban international footballer who plays as a forward for Cuban club Pinar del Río.

Club career
Born in Los Palacios, Pinar del Río Province, Alfonso played the majority of his career for local team Pinar del Río.

International
He made his debut for Cuba in a 2013 CONCACAF Gold Cup match against Costa Rica. He scored his first international goal against the United States in his second international appearance.

His final international match was a November 2014 Caribbean Cup match against Haiti.

International goals

Scores and results list Cuba's goal tally first.

References

External links

1984 births
Living people
Cuban footballers
Cuba international footballers
Association football forwards
FC Pinar del Río players
FC Ciudad de La Habana players
FC Isla de La Juventud players
FC Santiago de Cuba players
FC Artemisa players
2013 CONCACAF Gold Cup players
2014 Caribbean Cup players
People from Pinar del Río Province